Euparyphus elegans is a species of soldier flies in the tribe Oxycerini.

Distribution
Mexico.

References 

Stratiomyidae
Insects described in 1830
Insects of Mexico
Taxa named by Christian Rudolph Wilhelm Wiedemann
Diptera of North America